Unterhaltungssoftware Selbstkontrolle (Entertainment Software Self-Regulation, abbreviated USK) is the organisation responsible for video game ratings in Germany. In Austria, it is mandatory in the state of Salzburg, while PEGI is mandatory in Vienna.

Ratings

Original ratings
These are ratings used from 2003 until 2009–2010.

According to the USK itself, the state uses the age-rating symbol to regulate whether a computer game may be publicly supplied to children and young persons. Retailers are obliged to comply with the restrictions indicated by the rating. For example, a game approved for children aged 12 and above may not be sold to a 10-year old. Outside of business relations (e.g. parents or adult friends giving the game to a child or youth) there is no such restriction.

Advertisement of games rated USK 16 or below is not restricted only if the advertisement itself has no content that is harmful to minors. Games without a USK rating are treated like a USK 18 game.

Additionally the BPjM maintains a List of media harmful to young people (colloquially known as the "Index"). Titles that are on this list may only be sold on request to adults 18 or older, are not to be advertised in any media or put on display in retail stores. German retail stores, mail order and internet vendors tend to sell only games that do have a USK rating, due to the massive restrictions. These games are still sold from vendors outside Germany into the German market, but the numbers are low.

Only games that are not rated harmful to young people by the BPjM may get a USK rating. Many non-German publishers and developers choose to release edited versions of their games to try to prevent an 18+ rating either fearing the same negative sales impact an AO rating would have in the US, or out of fear that an 18+ title might be indexed by the BPjM.

In 2006, Microsoft chose not to release Gears of War on the German market. Since the game was imported to the German market nonetheless (without any age limit), the BPjM became involved and put the game on the index list. The same applied to the second instalment. Afterwards the rating procedure was revised, and imported games without a USK rating are automatically considered 18+ regardless of content. The third game did get classified with a USK 18 rating.

Restrictions
Up through 2018, USK had banned games that contained imagery of certain groups, including Nazis, Neo-Nazis, the Ku Klux Klan, or negative depiction of any religions, as required by Strafgesetzbuch (German code) section 86a, by refusing to rate such games, effectively making them unavailable to purchase in retail channels. While Section 86a included a "social adequacy" clause that allowed such images to be used in areas like education, science, and art (including literature and film), video games were not considered as qualifying under that section USK enforced. To publish affected games in Germany, developers and publishers had to strip out and replace objectionable images. One example is Wolfenstein: The New Order, which replaced swastikas on uniforms with a fictional symbol.

In August 2018, USK announced that the German government would relax this Section 86a restriction on video games, as long as the imagery included falls within the "social adequacy" allowance. USK evaluates how relevant imagery is used and reject games they believe fail to meet the social adequacy allowance. In 2019, the simultaneously released Wolfenstein: Youngblood and Wolfenstein: Cyberpilot were the first games allowed to depict Nazi imagery under the "social adequacy clause". Despite being officially rated by USK, major German retailers, such as MediaMarkt, Saturn, and GameStop, refused to sell the uncensored version, offering only the separately sold German version without Nazi imagery and references.

See also 
 Freiwillige Selbstkontrolle der Filmwirtschaft, the equivalent rating system for film.

References

External links
 Official website
 Ratings explained
 BPJM Ratings explained  

Video game organizations
Video game content ratings systems
Entertainment rating organizations
Communications and media organisations based in Germany
Video gaming in Germany
Mass media companies